John "Jack" Roderick (March 16, 1926 - October 19, 2020) was mayor of Anchorage. Originally from Seattle, Washington, Roderick was the son of a Presbyterian preacher who served in France during WWI. His parents divorced when he was 11 years of age, but this event did not affect his determination to succeed. In an interview, he stated that he was not born to work in a big city and wanted to be his own person.

Early life and education 
Roderick attended Broadway High School, graduating in 1944. Shortly after graduating high school, he went to London for a summer course in economics at the Leeds University, where he played basketball, football, and was a member of the track team as a teenager. During his formative years, he continued to play football at Yale University. He was a patriotic citizen who volunteered to join the Navy Air Corps during WWII. He was described in the newspaper as a brilliant football player. Subsequently, he was transferred to Yale University where he obtained a bachelor's degree in political science in 1949.  He turned down an $8000,00 a year career with the Chicago Bears because of lower back problems and a dislocated elbow that caused him neck problems.  

One event that marked his life dramatically during his college years was the crash of a DC-6 airplane that had been contracted by Yale University to bring students back to school after Christmas break. The airplane was overloaded, crashing at takeoff, killing 14 students. Roderick was one of three survivors, whose mother came to the scene of the accident, where she found him crying, dazed, and in a state of shock, while he was identifying his dead classmates.

Adult life and higher education 
Following graduation, he moved to Michigan, then San Francisco, but shortly after, he went to Alaska looking to make money. He found a job at a cannery located on Afognak Island, near Kodiak Island; he made good money, allowing him to pay his college debt and also help pay his friends and classmates. He decided to remain in Alaska permanently by 1954.  During one of his trips, going back home for Christmas, he met a woman from Tennessee named Martha Brady Martin. They fell in love and married "under the midnight sun" in 1955.

Roderick furthered his education by attending  the University of Washington, School of Law, graduating with a J.D. in 1959. After twenty years of working and raising a family, he decided to go back to school and attended Harvard Kennedy School at Harvard University, obtaining an M.P.A. (1981).

Jack Roderick lived to be 94. He died on October 19, 2020, celebrated by many for his lifelong accomplishments. Family and friends gathered at his house in Anchorage to find out the status of his health. During his last days alive, he encouraged people to vote, and many admirers that came to his home to say goodbye and thanked him for his contributions to the community.  His daughter Elizabeth "Libby" Roderick was there, alongside the many friends gathering at his house to say goodbye.

Civic leadership 
Jack Roderick contributed significantly to the civic life of Alaska. As a young adventurous individual in need of money to support his growing family, he drove a truck as a Teamster, a member of the international brotherhood that began in the early 1900. He delivered goods and milk to the North Slope, and in one of those trips he had the idea of starting an oil scouting business called Alaska Scouting Service, later turning it into an enterprise of many businesses: Alaska Abstract Service, Petroleum Publications, Inc., Alaska Petroleum Directory, Alaska Map Service, Van Cleve Printing Company, Alaska Industry magazine, Alaska Title Guaranty Company, Alaska Pacific Capital Corporation (SBIC), and oil exploration companies, Ivy, Inc. (oil & gas leasing). Later, in 1964, it turned into Alaska Exploration Corporation (geological, leasing and exploration). Another of his many accomplishments was Deputy commissioner of State Department of Natural Resources from 1976 to 1978, followed by a position as Alaska Director of US Farmers' Home Administration in 1978.

Roderick began his law practice, opening a law firm called Stevens and Roderick (1961–63). After Senator Ted Stevens was appointed to work in Washington DC, the firm became Holland and Roderick (1969–70). During the years 1967–68, Jack Roderick lived abroad with his daughters, Libby and Sarah, and his wife Martha, as a Regional Director of the U.S Peace Corps based in India. Then in 1971–72, he served as a Public Affairs Consultant for  Alyeska Pipeline.

Roderick became Mayor of the Borough of Anchorage (1972–75). His campaign was managed by his brother David Roderick. During his public service as a mayor of Anchorage, he founded the public transit "People Mover" system, community schools, and The Anchorage Federation of Community Councils. The Community Councils proved to be the contribution that made him the must proud, because it gave to each neighborhood a voice in the issues and decisions of the town.  He encouraged local residents to participate in council and assembly meetings, and through civic engagement, he helped to establish Anchorage Trail Systems.

After attending Harvard Kennedy School, he became the Alaska State Energy Director, a member of the Oil and Gas Royalty Development Advisory Board in 1984–85. He became Chairman of the Alaska Democratic Party from1985-88. In 1980–81, he began to research information to write his book Crude Dreams: A Personal History of Oil and Politics in Alaska that was finished and published by Epicenter Press in 1997.  In 1997, during the administration of President Bill Clinton, there was news about the possible nomination of Jack Roderick as a member of the Arctic Research Commission.

Roderick shared his life experience and expertise in business law as an adjunct professor at the University of Alaska Anchorage, and as an instructor teaching about Alaska's Oil Industry at the Alaska Pacific University.  He became part of the Chancellor's Advisory Board at UAA and also UAA's College of Fellows.

Legacy 

Roderick's biggest legacy to the community of Anchorage was the Community Council, which has become the Anchorage Federation of Community Councils.  One day, during lunch at his house with his wife, Martha, and his brother, tired of listening to him about how wrong the officials were going about helping the community, his wife asked him to run for Mayor and that's how it all began. The Community Council idea was taken from a Mayor from the city of Oregon.  He served as a mayor of Anchorage from 1972 to 1975, managing a budget of $100 million and had 2,000 employees in a city of  175,000 people.

References 

Mayors of Anchorage, Alaska
1926 births
2020 deaths
Yale University alumni
University of Washington School of Law alumni
Harvard Kennedy School alumni
University of Alaska Anchorage faculty
Alaska Pacific University faculty